Fumone is a comune (municipality) in the Province of Frosinone in the Italian region of Lazio, located about  southeast of Rome and about  northwest of Frosinone.

Geography
The town is on an isolated conical hill upon the Sacco Valley. It borders with the municipalities of Alatri, Anagni, Ferentino, and Trivigliano.

Main sights
The castle of Fumone was the main Papal stronghold in southern Latium. Today it houses an archaeological museum. Pope Celestine V was jailed here after his renunciation of the papal throne.

Also notable is the church of Santa Maria Annunziata, which houses relics of St. Sebastian.

References

External links

 Fumone official website 

Cities and towns in Lazio
Castles in Italy